Straub is a Germanic surname that literally means "one with bushy or bristly hair". Its original meaning in Middle High German is "rough" or "unkempt". It may also refer to people who come from Straubing in Germany.  Spelling variations of Straub include Straube, Strauber, Straubinger, Strauble, Strob, Strobel, Strube, Strub, Strufe, Struwe, and Struwing.

The first known Straub in the United States was Johannes Straub, one of the Palatine Germans brought to New York in 1710.  There were later arrivals, especially in the Pennsylvania Deutsch region and Ohio, most with an origin in Baden-Württemberg, Hesse-Darmstadt, Rhineland-Palatinate, Bavaria, Austria, the German cantons of Switzerland, and Alsace-Lorraine.  Some Straubs who had earlier migrated east out of Germany, settling in German enclaves in Russia and Austria-Hungary (now Romania), have subsequently immigrated to the U.S. as well.

There were two notable breweries founded in Pennsylvania by Straub immigrants.  The earliest was the J. N. Straub & Company brewery founded in the 1840s in Alleghany (now Pittsburgh), Pennsylvania, by John N. Straub, immigrant from Hesse-Darmstadt.  The other was the Straub Brewery founded in 1872 in St. Marys, Pennsylvania, by Peter P. Straub, immigrant from Felldorf, Württemberg.

Other notable landmarks and companies named after a Straub include Bob Straub State Park in Oregon and Straub Hall at the University of Oregon in Eugene; Straub's Markets, a St. Louis, Missouri-based specialty food retailer; Straub Clinic & Hospital in Hawaii. Straub Honda Dealership in Wheeling, West Virginia

During the Second World War there was a Sclass Cannon destroyer escort named  that was built for the U.S. Navy. The ship was named after its sponsor, Mrs. Margaret H. Straub.

There is also an asteroid named 6147 Straub.

Notable Straubs 

Notable individuals with the surname Straub include:
 Agnes Straub, (1890-1941) German film actress
 Alexander Straub (entrepreneur), entrepreneur and financier
 Alexander Straub (athlete), German pole vaulter
 Bill Straub, American soccer player
 Brunó Ferenc Straub, Hungarian politician
 Calvin Straub, American architect
 Chester J. Straub, Senior Circuit Judge of the United States Court of Appeals
 Christian Markle Straub, Member of the U.S. House of Representatives
 Christopher Straub, contestant on reality series Project Runway
 Elek Straub, Hungarian engineer, consultant and businessman
 Hans Straub, Swiss Olympic sprint canoer
 Jean-Marie Straub, French filmmaker
 Joe Straub, Major League Baseball catcher
 Johann Baptist Straub, German Baroque artist
 John E. Straub, Director of the White House Office of Administration
 Jürgen Straub, East German middle distance runner
 Kris Straub, webcomic creator
 Maria Straub (1838–1898), American songwriter, hymnwriter
 Marianne Straub, 20th century textile designer
 Michael John Straub, artist and printmaker
 Paul F. Straub, Philippine–American War Medal of Honor recipient
 Peter Straub, prolific horror author
 Peter Straub (politician), German politician
 Peter P. Straub, founder of the Straub Brewery in St. Marys, Pennsylvania
 Philipp Jakob Straub, Austrian sculptor
 Robert W. Straub, (1920–2002) Governor of Oregon
 Rudolph Straub, German prisoner-of-war executed during World War II
 Simon Straub, German luthier and violin maker (17th Century)
 Stephan Straub, German footballer
 Wolfgang Straub, Swiss lawyer and photographer
 Zoë Straub, Austrian singer

References

External links 
 Homepage Dr. Rainer H Straub, Regensburg, Germany
 U.S. Census Data of Surname STRAUB
 Map of Straub distribution in the United States in 1990
 Straub Genealogy and Family History
 The Straub Y-chromosome DNA Surname Project
 John N. Straub, founder of the J.N. Straub & Company Brewery in Alleghany, Pennsylvania
 Peter P. Straub, founder of the Straub Brewery in Saint Marys, Pennsylvania

Surnames
Surnames from nicknames